Thomas Déruns (born 1 March 1982) is a Swiss former professional ice hockey forward who played exclusively in the National League A (NLA).

Playing career
Déruns began playing with HC La Chaux-de-Fonds in 2000. He joined Genève-Servette in 2002.

Déruns was selected to play for the Swiss national team at the 2010 Winter Olympics. He previously represented Switzerland at the 2002 IIHF World U20 Championship, and the 2006, 2008 and 2009 Ice Hockey World Championships.

On 17 April 2010, Déruns scored a fantastic goal on Swiss National TV) in the Swiss National League A Playoff finals match Geneva vs. Berne that brought him mass media attention all over the world.

Career statistics

Regular season and playoffs

International

References

External links
 

1982 births
Living people
SC Bern players
Genève-Servette HC players
Ice hockey players at the 2010 Winter Olympics
HC La Chaux-de-Fonds players
Lausanne HC players
Olympic ice hockey players of Switzerland
Swiss ice hockey left wingers
People from La Chaux-de-Fonds
Sportspeople from the canton of Neuchâtel